Alexander Aleksandrovich Chernykh (born 12 September 1965) is a retired Soviet ice hockey player. He won a gold medal at the 1988 Winter Olympics.   He played for HC CSKA Moscow.  He was inducted into the Russian and Soviet Hockey Hall of Fame in 1988.

Career statistics

Regular season and playoffs

International

External links
bio
 Russian and Soviet Hockey Hall of Fame bio

1965 births
Living people
HC CSKA Moscow players
HC Khimik Voskresensk players
Ice hockey players at the 1988 Winter Olympics
New Jersey Devils draft picks
Olympic gold medalists for the Soviet Union
Olympic ice hockey players of the Soviet Union
Olympic medalists in ice hockey
People from Voskresensk
Soviet ice hockey centres
Honoured Masters of Sport of the USSR
Medalists at the 1988 Winter Olympics
Sportspeople from Moscow Oblast